Aurélien Noël (16 September 1904 – 16 December 1991) was a Canadian chartered accountant, lawyer, lecturer, professor and politician. Noël served as a Liberal party member of the House of Commons of Canada. He was born in Saint-Ferdinand, Quebec.

He was first elected at the Outremont—Saint-Jean riding in a 29 May 1967 by-election, called when the previous Member of Parliament, Maurice Lamontagne, was appointed to the Senate.

As the 1968 federal election approached, Noël faced some pressure to step aside so that Maurice Sauvé, an area resident, could become the Liberal candidate for the riding, which was then renamed Outremont. However, Noël did not give way to Sauvé and was re-elected to a full term in the 28th Canadian Parliament. Noël's career in Parliament ended when he was replaced as Outremont's Liberal party candidate by Marc Lalonde for the 1972 election. Noël did not participate in another federal election since. He died on 16 December 1991.

References

External links
 

1904 births
1991 deaths
Members of the House of Commons of Canada from Quebec
Liberal Party of Canada MPs
Lawyers in Quebec
20th-century Canadian lawyers